Euterranova is a genus of parasitic nematodes that have life cycles involving elasmobranchs.
The genus was created in 2020 to accommodate species which were previously included inTerranova Leiper & Atkinson, 1914  a taxon considered to be invalid.

Etymology
The name Euterranova is composed of Terranova (the name of a nematode genus) and the prefix Eu- (= proper, true). The gender is feminine.

Species

The type-species is E. dentiduplicata Moravec & Justine, 2020. It was described in 2020 from specimens from the stomach of the Zebra shark Stegostoma fasciatum, collected from off New Caledonia.

Other species are listed in the taxobox. All are parasites of elasmobranchs. An undescribed species (Euterranova sp.) was also recorded from the shark Triaenodon obesus off New Caledonia.

See also 
Neoterranova

References

External links 

Parasites
Parasitic nematodes of fish
Nematodes described in the 20th century
Ascaridida